Rukirabasaija Sir George David Matthew Kamurasi Rukidi III was Omukama of the Kingdom of Toro from 1928 until 1965. He was the eleventh (11th) Omukama of Toro.

See also
 Omukama of Toro

References

External links

1904 births
1965 deaths
Columbia University alumni
People from Kabarole District
Toro
Toro people
Ugandan police officers